Yemisi Ransome-Kuti is the only child of Azariah Olusegun Ransome-Kuti MBE (who was appointed Chief Pharmacist for the Federation of Nigeria in 1956 and who served until his retirement from the federal Medical Service. In 1951, he was appointed Member of the Most Excellent Order of the British Empire by King George VI). She is also the granddaughter of the Rev. Canon Josiah Ransome-Kuti. Her aunt Chief Funmilayo Ransome-Kuti was a foremost feminist in Nigeria who was also part of the delegation that went to negotiate the terms of independence for their country from the British.

Ransome-Kuti is the cousin of Fela Kuti, Olikoye Kuti, Beko Ransome-Kuti and Africa's first Nobel Prize for Literature-winner Wole Soyinka, whose mother was a Ransome-Kuti. She has four children: Segun Bucknor by her first husband, the late Naval Captain Frederick Oluwole Bucknor, and three by her second husband, Dr Kunle Soyemi - Bola Soyemi, Seun Soyemi and Eniola Soyemi. With Fela Kuti, Beko Kuti and Koye Kuti all dead, Yemisi is the current head of the Ransome-Kuti family.

She recently retired as chairperson of the organization she founded, The Nigerian Network of Non-Governmental Organizations (NNNGO). The first organization of its kind in Nigeria to bring together civil society organizations, it has worked since its formation in 1992 to effect a harmonized agenda for third-sector development and its influence in the national framework. 

In the early 1990s, she established "Girl Watch"; an organization aimed at educating young Nigerian girls from poor backgrounds. In 2006, she was appointed a Civil Society advisor to the World Bank. Yemisi Ransome-Kuti was one of those leading the charge in working for Nigeria to meet its Millennium Development Goals and eradicate poverty.

Awards and recognition 
On May 28, 2022, Ransome-Kuti was nominated among the impact makers to receive the outstanding intellectual of the year. This was hosted by the Women of inestimable values foundation, in Lagos, Nigeria.

References

Nigerian feminists
Nigerian women activists
Ransome-Kuti family
Living people
Year of birth missing (living people)
Yoruba women activists